Alyoshenka (diminutive of the Russian male first name Alexey) or the Kyshtym Dwarf is believed by many to be a prematurely born female baby with many deformities found in the village of Kaolinovy, near Kyshtym, Chelyabinsk Oblast, Russia in May 1996. Subsequently, the remains were lost and only photos and videos survive. Various supernatural and mystical explanations arose.

Discovery 
A small human fetus, given the name "Alyoshenka", was found by an elderly woman, Tamara Vasilyevna Prosvirina. The fetus had an unusual appearance, giving rise to rumours of its extraterrestrial origin. The local population readily supported this rumour, collecting fees from reporters for interviews – at least two Japanese companies (Asahi TV and MTV Japan) made documentaries about the remains.

Physical appearance 
Alyoshenka was a greyish fetus about 25 centimetres (9.8 in) in length. Its hairless head had a number of dark spots. The eyes were large, occupying most of the face. The skull was smooth with strange ridges that all met in a central ridge, similar to the appearance of a leaf's veins. The skull in particular did not resemble the skull of a healthy human.

Later incidents 
Somewhere between a few days to a month after the discovery, Prosvirina was admitted to a hospital or psychiatric hospital (details vary on this) for treatment, and in some accounts the remains were passed to the local militsiya (police) by a neighbour. In most accounts, once the body was given to authorities in order to get DNA testing, it "disappeared" and Prosvirina's family was unable to retrieve it from authorities. In 1999, Prosvirina was killed in a car accident in an attempt to escape from the hospital.

Speculation 
Little is known about what happened to the remains, and accounts of Alyoshenka's death and appearance vary greatly. A local ufologist claimed that the corpse was taken away by a UFO inhabited by members of Alyoshenka's species. Some skeptics hold that it was bought by a wealthy collector of curiosities. A doctor from the local hospital who had allegedly seen the corpse reported that it corresponded to a normal 20- to 25-week human fetus, born prematurely. It could have lived for several hours, but not several weeks, contrary to Prosvirina's claims.

Testing 
Bendlin decided initially that this was the mummified remains of a child and took it to Dr. Irina Yermolaeva for analysis. She stated that it was not a hoax in that it was a genuine mummified body that was once living tissue. Her conclusions were that it was a premature child that was deformed, something which could be attributed to the far-reaching fall-out of the 1957 Kyshtym Disaster.

On 15 April 2004, scientists made an official statement that the "Kyshtym creature" was a premature female human infant, with severe deformities. However, other experts and eyewitnesses said it could not have been a human as there were too many differences (up to 20 were counted) in the skeleton that varied from a human being, especially in regard to the skull.

Bendlin's clinical assistant, Lyubov Romanowa, who herself had seen many deformities in children, stated that "they had never seen anything like this" and that she believed that it was "not of human origin". She said the differences were just too many, not least of which was the number of bones on the head, four in total, that had sharp edges which were "completely different to a human being".

A March 2018 study on the similar Atacama skeleton found an extremely high number of mutations for bone and muscle formation, suggesting that such major mutations, although extremely rare, are possible.

See also 
Human–animal hybrid
Kosmopoisk

References 

Alleged UFO-related entities
1996 in Russia
Children and death